Do Ankhen Barah Hath is a 1997 Indian action drama film directed by Kirti Kumar. The movie stars Govinda, Madhuvanti, Aruna Irani and Sadashiv Amrapurkar.

Plot
Wealthy Sharda is in love with poor Vinod Kumar and would like to marry him. But her gangster brother, Vishwanath Dayaram refuses to permit her, as he would like her to marry Nano, a garage owner and fellow-gangster, with whom he already has arranged her marriage. So Vishwanath gets Vinod killed, and Sharda, who is pregnant, runs away and gives birth to a baby boy, from whom she unfortunately separates. Vishwanath has sent his men to kill Sharda and her child at any cost, but she continues to elude them. Twenty years later Sharda does meet her brother — who is just on the verge of killing Sagar — who is none other than her estranged son.

Cast
 Govinda ... Sagar
 Johnny Lever as Rickshaw walla
 Arun Govil ... Police Inspector
 Madhuvanti Patwardhan as Vidya
 Rupali Ganguly ... Neeta Dayaram
 Raman Khatri as Raman (Neeta's husband)
 Aruna Irani ... Sharda
 Sadashiv Amrapurkar ... Vishwanath Dayaram
 Asrani ... Jagjivan Ram Barjatya
 Anil Dhawan ... Vinod Kumar
 Ishrat Ali ... Nano
 Arjun ... Police Inspector
 Kiran Kumar ... Daman Sood
 Harish Patel ... Keshav Bapu Darwaza
 Akhilendra Mishra ... "Kumar Khidki" Keshav Bapu's Son

Music
Music Director: Bappi Lahiri

Lyricist: Indeevar

Track list:

 "Ae Mausam Suhane" – Abhijeet Bhattacharya, Alka Yagnik (Not in the Film)
 "De De De De" – Sudesh Bhosle
 "Jo Bhi Dekhe Aap Ko" – Kavita Krishnamurthy, Kumar Sanu
 "Karte Hain Hum Pyaar" – Kirti Kumar, Alka Yagnik
 "Kasam Se Kasam Se" – Alka Yagnik, Kumar Sanu
 "Mile Jo Tere Naina" – Alka Yagnik, Kumar Sanu
 "Ho Gaya Ji Ho Gaya" – Kavita Krishnamurthy, Kumar Sanu

External links
 

1997 films
1990s Hindi-language films
Films scored by Bappi Lahiri

Indian action drama films
Indian films about revenge
1990s action drama films